The following list shows NCAA Division I football programs by winning percentage during the 1970–1979 football seasons. This list includes teams in Division I, and Division I-A after Division I split into two sub-divisions following the 1977 season. The following list reflects the records according to the NCAA. This list takes into account results modified later due to NCAA action, such as vacated victories and forfeits. This list only takes into account games played while in Division I-A.

 

 Chart notes

 The Southwestern Athletic Conference moved to Division I in 1977, and then joined Division  I-AA in 1978.
 Central Michigan joined Division I in 1975.
 Tennessee State joined Division I in 1977.
 Ball State joined Division I in 1975.
 UNLV joined Division I in 1978
 McNeese State joined Division I in 1975.
 Temple joined Division I in 1971.
 East Tennessee State joined Division I in 1979.
 Arkansas State joined Division I in 1974.
 Louisiana Tech joined Division I in 1975.
 Western Carolina joined Division I in 1977.
 Northwestern State joined Division I for the 1976 & 1977 seasons.
 Chattanooga joined Division I in 1971.
 Hawaii joined Division I in 1974.
 Appalachian State joined Division I in 1972.
 Louisiana–Lafayette joined Division I in 1974.
 Eastern Michigan joined Division I in 1975.
 Lamar joined Division I in 1973.
 Idaho left Division I after the 1974 season.
 Texas-Arlington joined Division I in 1971.
 Southern Illinois joined Division I in 1972.
 Drake joined Division I in 1971.
 Cal State Fullerton joined Division I in 1975.
 Illinois State joined Division I in 1975.
 Dayton left Division I after the 1976 season.
 Indiana State joined Division I in 1975.
 Xavier dropped their football program after 1973.
 UC Santa Barbara left Division I after the 1971 season.
 Davidson left Division I after the 1973 season.
 Buffalo suspended its football program after the 1970 season.
 Cal State Los Angeles left Division I after the 1971 season.

See also
 NCAA Division I FBS football win–loss records
 NCAA Division I football win–loss records in the 1960s
 NCAA Division I-A football win–loss records in the 1980s

References

Lists of college football team records